Manual stimulation may refer to:

Massage, the manual stimulation of various parts of the body
Manual stimulation of nipples
A euphemism for masturbation
Handjob, the manual stimulation of the male genitalia
Fingering (sexual act)